Ulisse Giuseppe Gozzadini (10 October 1650 – 20 March 1728) was an Italian Cardinal who served as bishop of Imola.

Early life
Gozzadini was born in Bologna and was of a patrician family. He was the son of Palatine Count Marcantonio Gozzadini and Ginevra Leoni. He was educated at the University of Bologna, where he received a doctorate in canon law in 1670 and a doctorate in civil law in 1674. He was a page in the court of the Grand Duchy of Tuscany in 1658. He served as a canon theologian of the cathedral chapter of Bologna from 1673 to 1693, and a professor of law at the University of Bologna from 1674 to 1694. He went to Rome in 1693. He was made a canon of the chapter of the patriarchal Vatican basilica in 1691. He served as secretary of Briefs to the Princes from 1697.

Episcopate
He was appointed archbishop of Teodosia in partibus infidelium on 8 September 1700 and was consecrated on 12 September 1700 in Rome by Bandino Panciatici, Cardinal-Priest of San Pancrazio, with Prospero Bottini, Titular Archbishop of Myra, and Leonardo Marsili, Archbishop of Siena, serving as co-consecrators. He was confirmed as secretary of Briefs to the Princes by the new, pope, Pope Clement XI on 7 December 1700.

Cardinalate
He was created and proclaimed Cardinal-Priest of Santa Croce in Gerusalemme in the consistory of 15 April 1709. He was released from his see and transferred to the see of Imola, with personal title of archbishop on 19 February 1710.  He served as Legate a latere to represent the pope at the wedding, of King Philip V of Spain and Princess Isabella Farnese of Parma on 20 August 1714. He participated in the conclave of 1721, which elected Pope Innocent XIII. He also participated in the conclave of 1724, which elected Pope Benedict XIII. He died in 1728 of an apoplexy in Imola.

References

1650 births
1728 deaths
18th-century Italian cardinals
Bishops of Imola